Girmapur is a village and panchayat in Rangareddy district, Telangana, India. It comes under Medchal mandal.
The Sarpanch of the village is Navaneetha Anand of TRS-TelanganaRashtraSamithi.
The village is famous for Stone Crushing Industries.

There's a historic temple in the village outskirts, Mallana Gudi. An annual celebration of this deity is celebrated every year, called Mallana Jathara.

References

Villages in Ranga Reddy district